Kottampatti is a village in Madurai, which is district border in North direction on Nation Highway. Kottampatti is also one of revenue block in the Madurai district of Tamil Nadu, India. It has a total of 27 panchayat villages (including 247 villages).

References 
 

Revenue blocks of Madurai district